Vincent Almendros (born in 1978, Avignon) is a French novelist.

Biography 
Vincent Almendros studied letters at the University of Avignon before beginning to write poetry and prose. He sent his first completed novel, Ma chère Lise, to Jean-Philippe Toussaint for his advice. Toussaint appreciated it and introduced the author to Irène Lindon, which led to its publication in 2011. In 2015, his second novel Un été, much welcomed by the critics, was awarded the prix Françoise Sagan in June of that year.

Works 
2011: Ma chère Lise, Les Éditions de Minuit, 
2015: Un été, Les Éditions de Minuit,  – prix Françoise Sagan

References

External links 
 Un été on Babelio
 Un été de Vincent Almendros, roman brûlant de la rentrée d’hiver on France Info
 Vincent Almendros, prix Sagan 2015 on Le Figaro (15 June 2015)
 Vincent Almendros - Un été on YouTube

21st-century French novelists
1978 births
Writers  from Avignon
Living people